The 2021 Maharlika Pilipinas Basketball League (MPBL) Finals (also known as the MPBL Lakan Cup Finals), was the best-of-5 championship series of the 2019–20 MPBL season, and the conclusion of the 2020–21 MPBL Playoffs. This was the first championship series in which will be held entirely in a bubble in Subic. The San Juan Knights, as the Northern Division Champions, will compete against the Davao Occidental Tigers, as the Southern Division Champions, in the series for the third overall championship contested by the league. This was also a rematch of the series after the Knights won the 2019 MPBL Championship against the Tigers in five games. The Southern Division champions Davao Occidental won the championship after defeating the defending champions San Juan in four games to avenge their finals loss last season. 
After almost a year of stoppage of play due to the COVID-19 pandemic, the league was given an approval by the IATF-EID to stage the Subic Bubble. All games were broadcast through A2Z Channel 11 of the ZOE Broadcasting Network and the league's official Facebook page. The series were supposed to commence on March 12 but later moved to March 17.

Overview 
The league stopped play on March 11, 2020, after the second game of the Division Finals, after the outbreak of the pandemic spread throughout the country, thus shelving the remaining games of the playoffs. A year later, after the league got an approval from the government and the IATF, the league will resume its games inside a bubble starting March 10, which features the Game Threes of the Division Finals that was shelved a year ago. The series will not feature a home-and-away format due to the threat of the ongoing pandemic. All games will be played in the Subic Bay Gymnasium, the venue of the sepak takraw event that was used in the 2019 Southeast Asian Games.

Background

San Juan Knights 
The San Juan Knights entered the season as the defending champions, winning the 2019 MPBL Championship against the Davao Occidental Tigers. They started the season with a 10-game winning streak and eventually finishing the regular season with a 26–4 win-loss card to hold the league's best record, a tiebreaker that was broken as the Knights have defeated the Tigers in the regular-season game. In the playoffs, they easily defeated 8th-seeded Pasay Voyagers and 4th-seeded Pasay Voyagers and Pampanga Giant Lanterns in the first two rounds, both in just two games. The Division Finals saw the Makati Super Crunch, who have qualified for their first Division Finals appearance. Both teams split the first two games, and the series went to a decider. The decider game three saw only 5 players play from the Makati side, as the Knights overpowered the other team in a record-setting match, 131–54, and eventually clinch the Northern Division championship for the second consecutive season and advance for their second straight MPBL Finals appearance.

Davao Occidental Tigers 
The Davao Occidental Tigers entered the season as the runners-up, losing to the San Juan Knights in the 2019 MPBL Finals. They have started the season with a 10–1 win-loss record and eventually finishing the regular season with a 26–4 win-loss record, identical to that of the Knights, but only held the 2nd league-best record as they fell to San Juan in the regular-season matchup. In the first round, the team were pushed to the limits by Bicol Volcanoes, forcing a decider, and eventually won the series in three games. The Division Semifinals saw themselves making an easy sweep of the Zamboanga Family's Brand Sardines in two games, and facing the Basilan Steel in the Division Finals. The Steel shocked the Tigers in the first game, and the Tigers even the series at one-apiece before the stoppage, forcing a decider. But the decider game three was not played and gave a default win for the team as the league gave an ultimatum to the Basilan team that should another member of the Basilan team catch the virus, a default win would be awarded. On March 16, the league gave the default 20–0 win to the Tigers to become the two-time Southern Division Champions to advance to their second straight MPBL Finals appearance, setting up a finals rematch against the very team in San Juan Knights.

Road to the Finals

Head-to-head matchup

Series summary

MPBL Finals

Game 1

Game 2

Game 3

Game 4

Broadcast notes 
The championship series were broadcast on A2Z Channel 11 and Kapamilya Channel and on the official Facebook page of the league. This will be the first time that the MPBL had a new broadcast partner in A2Z of the ZOE Broadcasting Network and pay television after ABS-CBN Sports, the sports division of ABS-CBN, was dissolved after the network was unable to renew its franchise.

References 

Maharlika Pilipinas Basketball League
2021 in Philippine basketball